Tandag, officially the City of Tandag (Tandaganon/Surigaonon: Siyudad nan Tandag; Cebuano: Dakbayan sa Tandag), is a 5th class component city and capital of the province of Surigao del Sur, Philippines. According to the 2020 census, it has a population of 62,669 people.

Farming and fishing are the main economic activity for most of the people in Tandag. Chief farm products are rice, corn, and coconut. Livestock and poultry raising are also important sources of income. Tandag has a national secondary airport and a seaport.

Tandag has a land area of 291.73 square kilometers or 112.64 square miles. This constitutes 5.91% of the land area of Surigao del Sur. The population density of the city is at 193 inhabitants per square kilometer or 500 inhabitants per square mile.

Etymology
Many versions have been given regarding the name of Tandag. One version states that Father Calan, Father Encarnacion, and another priest were on their way to visit chieftain Suba to baptize his people. When one of the missionaries asked a native rowing their boat what name of the place was with fingers pointing downward, the native thought the priest meant the school of fish. He answered "tamda", meaning look down. This name later became Tandag. Father Encarnacion, a member of the group, was later killed by the natives.

Another version states that when Spanish-Peruvian historian and explorer Inca Garcilaso de la Vega landed in Tandag to subdue the ferocious Caragas (as the rebellious natives were called then), he did not know the name of the place so he inquired from a native who was gathering the leaves of an herb locally known as tanglad. The native, who did not understand Spanish, answered "tangad". Later, the name was changed to Tandag.

Moreover, one more account tells of a group of Spanish soldiers and missionaries who lost their way around the settlement. When they asked for correct directions, the natives, who could not understand Spanish, only laughed at them all the while saying the word "tarantados", meaning lost. Thus, the name Tandag meant lost.

History 

Long before Tandag became what it is today—the bustling capital town of Surigao del Sur was inhabited by the Manobos and the Mamanwas who lived along the river banks under the leadership of Suba, their Chieftain. Suba was later converted into Christianity by Father Juan de la Encarnacion, a Spanish missionary. After Legazpi’s final conquest to the Philippines in 1609, the Spanish government sent missionaries accompanied by platoons of guardia civil to subdue the hostile natives. One of these missionaries was Father Juan de la Vega who was assigned in Tandag. In an effort to establish a symbol of authority, Fr. dela Vega erected a stone fort and built a small settlement about a size of a football field enclosed by a stone wall. Out of this settlement rose the town of Tandag, which later on became a center of faith.

During this period, Tandag became a port of call to the Spanish Galleon that sailed along the southern part of Mindanao. Until today, it is believed that somewhere underneath the sea near Tandag's Linongao Islands lies a sunken galleon ship.

After the Spanish missionaries' visit to Tandag, a group of Italian explorers and soldiers then landed in the city. They did what the Spanish did, but mandated that Italian be one of the city's primary language aside from Surigaonon, Cebuano, and Filipino. Strict compliance was enforced during those times, which explains why Italian became Tandag's local dialect aside from the mainstay Surigaonon.

In 1650, Tandag became the capital town of Surigao or Caraga, then a district that covered the present provinces of Agusan del Sur, Agusan del Norte, Surigao del Sur, Surigao del Norte, and a part of Davao. As the center of faith and capital town, Tandag was fortified with cottas which were erected sometime in the 18th century. The cottas were placed in the northern part of the town and near the old cemetery on the western side. These fortifications served to protect the town from Moro raids.

In several separate attacks between 1754 and 1767, the Moro pirates wrought havoc and destruction to Tandag. Father Jose Ducos, a Jesuit from Iligan, came to the rescue and rebuilt Tandag. He established the Tandag Garrison and restored the Tandag priory. Although a part of the Tandag fort survived, it was demolished during the Second World War. Calamities like typhoons and earthquakes destroyed what remained of it. This explains why there are no remains of these structures that could be seen today.

During World War II for much of the war, Tandag was free from Japanese occupation when the American and Filipino military forces surrendered in May 1942. However, on April 27, 1944, about 500 Japanese troops landed by a number of boats a short distance outside town. Most of the residents fled to the mountains nearby when the Japanese arrived. The 10th Military District of the U.S. Army maintained a guerrilla presence in Mindanao in World War II. Capt. Charles Hansen led a small group of guerrillas against the Japanese. Outnumbered, the guerrillas were unable to dislodge the Japanese and about ten days later another group of guerrillas made a second attempt to force the Japanese out. The Japanese remained in town several weeks and left after causing much damage in Tandag.

Real transformation was finally afforded to Tandag via Republic Act No. 2786, an act that created Surigao del Sur and whose salient measure made Tandag the capital and seat of the provincial government of Surigao del Sur.

Cityhood

On June 23, 2007, Tandag, by virtue of Republic Act No. 9392, became a city.

The Supreme Court declared the cityhood law of Tandag and 15 other cities unconstitutional after a petition filed by the League of Cities of the Philippines in its ruling on November 18, 2008. On December 22, 2009, the cityhood law of Tandag and 15 other municipalities regain its status as cities again after the court reversed its ruling on November 18, 2008. On August 23, 2010, the court reinstated its ruling on November 18, 2008, causing Tandag and 15 cities to become regular municipalities. Finally, on February 15, 2011, Tandag becomes a city again including the 15 municipalities declaring that the conversion to cityhood met all legal requirements.

After six years of legal battle, in its board resolution, the League of Cities of the Philippines acknowledged and recognized the cityhood of Tandag and 15 other cities.

Geography

Tandag City is located along the northeastern coast of Mindanao facing the Philippine Sea. It is bounded on the north by the municipalities of Cortes and Lanuza, on the east by the Philippine Sea, on the south by the towns of Tago and San Miguel, and on the west by the Municipality of Sibagat in the province of Agusan del Sur. It is located 448 nautical miles from Manila and 150 nautical miles from Cebu.

Barangays
Tandag is politically subdivided into 21 barangays. Majority of the barangays are considered rural areas.

Climate

Tandag has a tropical rainforest climate (Af) with heavy to very heavy rainfall year-round and extremely heavy rainfall in January.

Demographics

It consists of twenty-one (21) barangays. Six of which are urban barangays, five are coastal barangays, four are built-up expansions, and six are hinterland barangays. The urban barangays comprise 1,594.10 hectares; 3,464.61 hectares for coastal barangays; 2,233.15 hectares for built-up expansion barangays and 4,964.34 hectares for hinterland barangays.

Languages 
Major languages spoken in the area are Tandaganon, Surigaonon, Filipino, and Cebuano (Mindanao variant). English is widely used in schools, businesses, and government offices.

Economy

Commercial retail

Gaisano Capital Tandag is located along Cabrera and Navales Street. Gaisano Capital Group is a shopping mall chain in the Philippines, owned by Cebu-based Gaisano family.
TT & Company
Prince Town Tandag
Ultrastar Supermart

Delivery services
LBC Tandag
J&T Express
JRS Tandag
Entrego

Culture

 Tandag annually celebrates the feast day of San Nicolas de Tolentino, Tandag's patron saint, every September 10. A novena in honor of San Nicholas is held for nine consecutive days starting September 1 in the San Nicholas de Tolentino Cathedral. It is the highlight of the city's Fiesta. In connection to this, a week-long celebration is organized by the Local Government Unit of Tandag. Parades, concerts, and bazaars are just some of the activities lined up for the said celebration.
 Diwatahan Festival is held every January in honor of the Santo Niño. Tandag City also organizes a one-day cultural dance competition for interested dance groups held at the Tandag City Plaza. Diwatahan Festival is the counterpart of Cebu City's Sinulog festival.
 Since Tandag is the capital of the province of Surigao del Sur, it hosts the annual Araw ng Surigao del Sur Celebration. A trade fair showcasing products from the different municipalities of Surigao del Sur is one of the events in the celebration. Another event is a local pageant, Mutya ng Surigao del Sur, held at the Tandag City Gymnasium in Bongtud.

 Charter Day is held every 23rd day of June to celebrate the cityhood of Tandag. Different events are held during the day. Laguboh! is a drums and lyre corps competition among elementary and secondary schools in the city.
 Summer Kite Festival – an annual event initiated by the City Government of Tandag enhancing the artistic talent and creativity among the teenagers through the making of fantastic designs of kite enjoying the sun, sand and sea during summer time.
 Eco Sports Festival – Tandag City is a coastal city, with 10 of its 21 barangays facing the Pacific Ocean. Thus, the City Government of Tandag initiates a three-day event consisting of activities that promote the good care for the ocean. The events are participated by the youth sector, enhancing their skills in different activities like skim boarding, Frisbee, beach volleyball, urban adventure race, and sand castle sculpture making. For the culmination of the Ocean Month Celebration, there are live performances of bands from all over the country.
 TAMDA Festival – a Tandaganon variation of the word "Tan-awa" which means to "see beneath" or "to take care of". This showcases the correct and historically accurate cultural festival and explains the Tandaganons' art – dances, rituals, music, life ways, and creative expressions. It is an annual event of Tandag City in celebration of the Charter Day held every June 23.

Tourism

 Tago – Green Falls
San Isidro – Busay Falls
 Bioto – Cold Spring
 Pangi – Bugsukan Falls & Tagbak stream
 Salvacion – Abaca Plantation
 Quezon – Cave, Falls, & Wild Life
 Maticdum – Falls, Water Spring, Cave, Forest, & Wild Life Conservation
 San Agustin – Norte Beach Resort & Mangroves
 Mabuhay – Panugmakan Creek (Potable Water Source) Mt. Resort & Cave
 Dagocdoc – Board Walk (Dike) & Floating Restaurant
 Awasian – Ihawan Mt. Spring Resort/Hitaub IP Gawad Kalinga Project
 Pandanon – Cold Spring
 Rosario – Andap Falls & Spring
 Bag-ong Lungsod – Tandag City Boulevard
 Bongtud – Twin Linungao Island, Mancagangi Island & MPA (Fish Sanctuary)
 Buenavista – MPA (Fish Sanctuary)
 Mabua Beach Resort (MPA) – Fish Sanctuary

Transportation

City proper 

 Tricycle (roams around the vicinity of the city)
 Pedicab
Jeepney

Accessibility

By air 
via Tandag Airport: From Cebu, you can take direct flight to Tandag through Cebgo, which flies this route every M-W-F (destination terminated as of 2019).
via Francisco Bangoy (Davao) International Airport: From Manila or Cebu to Davao City as transit point, Philippine Airlines, Cebu Pacific and Cebgo fly the Manila-Davao (and vice versa) route (approx. 1- hours travel time) and the Cebu-Davao (and vice versa) route (approx. 45 minutes travel time) several trips daily.
via Surigao Airport: From Manila or Cebu to Surigao City as transit point, Cebgo flies these routes (approx. 1- hours travel time) daily.
via Bancasi (Butuan) Airport: From Manila or Cebu to Butuan as transit point, PAL Express, Cebu Pacific, and Cebgo fly these routes (approx. 1- hours travel time) three times a week.

By land 

 Multicabs, vans and jeepneys around northern and southern Surigao del Sur routes include Butuan, (fastest are the white vans plying the Butuan-Tandag route; their terminal is at the Bancase Airport), Surigao City, San Francisco, Agusan del Sur and Bislig.
 Buses – direct travel with bus companies like Bachelor Express are serving routes from Davao City, Butuan, Surigao City, and Bislig. Philtranco and PP Bus Line serving Pasay/Cubao via Cantilan are also available.
 Buses, vans and jeepneys can be located at Tandag City Overland Transport (TCOTT) (Balilahan Bus Terminal).
 Some jeepneys and tricycles bound for Surigao City, Cantilan, Cortes, Tago, San Miguel, and nearby municipalities and barangays can be found at Moonglow Public Market.

By sea 
Inter-island vessel Cokaliong Shipping Lines ply the Cebu-Surigao City routes on regular schedules with Surigao City Port as transit point. Multi-cabs and tricycles are available at the wharf going to Surigao City Integrated Terminal for the regular bus trips to Tandag.

Healthcare
Adela Serra Ty Memorial Medical Center – On February 15, 1993, the Surigao del Sur Provincial Hospital was renamed Adela Serra Ty Memorial Medical Center by Virtue of RA No. 7433 authored by then Congressman Mario Serra Ty.
Pama Polyclinic
Philippine Red Cross Tandag

Education

Basic education 

 Tandag Pilot Elementary School
 Tandag Central Elementary School
 Telaje Elementary School
 Quintos Elementary School
 Saint Theresa College of Tandag 
 Jacinto P. Elpa National High School
 Tandag National Science High School
 Vicente L. Pimentel Sr. National High School
 Buenavista Nursery School
 Buenavista Elementary School
 Buenavista National High School
 Tandag Christian School, Inc.
 Tandag City SpEd Center
 Tandag Science Elementary School
 Engr. Nestor Ty Memorial Elementary School
 Bongtud Elementary School
 Meliton M. Ajos Memorial Elementary School
 San Jose Elementary School
 Mahanon Elementary School
 Mabuhay Elementary School
 Pandanon Elementary School
 Carmen Integrated School
 San Antonio Elementary School

Higher education 
 Saint Theresa College of Tandag – College Dept.
 North Eastern Mindanao State University – Main Campus

Media

Sports and recreation

The Surigao del Sur Sports Center (formerly named as Gregorio P. Murillo Sports Complex) is a multi-sports complex, located near the provincial capitol situated in Tandag City, which has hosted the Caraga Regional Athletic Meet, several times. The Tandag City Gymnasium is an indoor gymnasium located at Luis Perez corner Serra Street, adjacent the local police station.

Sister cities
  Malaybalay, Philippines

References

External links

 Tandag Profile at the DTI Cities and Municipalities Competitive Index
 [ Philippine Standard Geographic Code]

Cities in Surigao del Sur
Provincial capitals of the Philippines
Populated places established in 1650
1650 establishments in the Philippines
States and territories established in 2009
Component cities in the Philippines